Kadakalaid is a small island in the Baltic Sea belonging to the country of Estonia. Its coordinates are 

Kadakalaid lies just northeast of the island of Hiiumaa and belongs to the administrative municipality of Pühalepa Parish, Hiiu County. Other small islands close by include: Veskirahu, Männaklaid, Hõralaid, Vohilaid, Hellamaa, Uuemererahu, Uuemaarahu and Ramsi.

See also
 List of islands of Estonia

References

Estonian islands in the Baltic
Hiiumaa Parish